Euphorbia grandidieri is a species of plant in the family Euphorbiaceae. It is endemic to Madagascar.  Its natural habitat is sandy shores. It is threatened by habitat loss.

References

Endemic flora of Madagascar
Vulnerable plants
grandidieri
Plants described in 1886
Taxonomy articles created by Polbot
Taxa named by Henri Ernest Baillon